Gazalina is a genus of moths in the family Notodontidae. The genus was erected by Francis Walker in 1865.

Species
Gazalina apsara (Moore, 1859) (India/China)
Gazalina chrysolopha (Kollar, [1844]) (Nepal/Bhutan)
Gazalina intermixta Swinhoe, 1900
Gazalina purificata Sugi, 1993 (Taiwan)
Gazalina transversa (Moore, 1879) (China/India)
Gazalina venosata Walker 1865

References

Thaumetopoeinae